The Hay railway line is a partly closed railway line in New South Wales, Australia. The line branches from the Main South line at Junee, and passes in a westwards direction through the towns of Coolamon and Narrandera to Yanco. The first train arrived in Hay on 4 July 1882. The line beyond Yanco to Hay is now closed, although the section to Willbriggie remained open for grain haulage until 2004. At Yanco, the still-open Yanco to Griffith line branches off in a northwesterly direction to Griffith.

Passenger services

Until 1986, passenger service operated over the section of line between Junee and Yanco on their way to Griffith, consisting of a through train to Sydney (the Riverina Express) on several days per week, with a connection service between Grifith and Junee (connecting with the South Mail) on the other days. A connecting railcar service was provided at Narrandera for passengers on the Tocumwal line operated three days per week, until withdrawn on Saturday 26 November 1983.

These services were withdrawn in 1986, and replaced by road coach services. Between 1986 and 1996, no passenger trains operated over the line until services were reintroduced in 1996 after considerable political pressure was placed upon the NSW State Government. A weekly locomotive train was initially reintroduced, subsequently replaced by a weekly Xplorer train. Railway stations remain open at Coolamon and Narrandera.

See also

Rail transport in New South Wales

References 

Regional railway lines in New South Wales
Standard gauge railways in Australia
Railway lines opened in 1882